The Hundred-Foot Journey is a 2014 American comedy-drama film directed by Lasse Hallström from a screenplay written by Steven Knight, adapted from Richard C. Morais' 2010 novel of the same name. It stars Helen Mirren, Om Puri, Manish Dayal, and Charlotte Le Bon, and is about a battle in a French village between two restaurants that are directly across the street from each other: a new Indian restaurant owned by an Indian emigrant family and an established French restaurant with a Michelin star owned by a French woman.

Produced by Steven Spielberg and Oprah Winfrey for DreamWorks Pictures through their respective production companies, Amblin Entertainment and Harpo Films (first relaunch film), in association with Participant Media and Reliance Entertainment, the film was released by Touchstone Pictures on August 8, 2014, and grossed $89.5 million at the worldwide box office.

Plot
The Muslim Konkani Kadam family runs a restaurant in Mumbai. As a child, the second-oldest son, Hassan, would shop with his mother at the market, where he was adept at picking the highest-quality food. Now a young man, he is in training to replace her as the restaurant's main cook. When a mob attacks and burns down the restaurant after a disputed election, his mother dies in the fire. Seeking asylum in Europe, the Kadams first settle in London, but they dislike the climate and their house, which is right next to Heathrow, so they depart for mainland Europe.

Near St. Antonin in the Midi-Pyrénées in France, the brakes on the Kadams' van fail. Marguerite, a local woman, passes by and helps tow the van to town. She invites the family into her apartment while they deal with the auto repair shop and arrange lodgings for the night, and she treats them to a tray of delicious food she made using fresh, local ingredients.

The next morning, Hassan follows his father, Abbu, to an abandoned property they passed the night before. A restaurant had been there, but it failed because Le Saule Pleureur ("The Weeping Willow"), an upscale French restaurant with a Michelin star, is located just across the street, a hundred feet away. Abbu buys the land anyway, as he is confident the Indian food Hassan will cook for their restaurant will attract customers.

Naming their restaurant Maison Mumbai, the Kadam family renovates the property. One day, Madame Mallory, the proprietor of Saule Pleureur, visits and asks to see their menu. Abbu hesitates, but Hassan gladly gives it to her in case she wishes to dine with them sometime. When she buys all of the ingredients the Kadams need from the local market on the day of their grand opening, a war of sabotage and complaints to the mayor of the village erupts between Abbu and Mallory. While this is going on, Hassan asks Marguerite, who is a sous chef at Saule Pleureur, to help him learn about French cooking, and they develop feelings for each other.

The war between the restaurants peaks on Bastille Day, when one of Mallory's chefs, Jean-Pierre, and two others spray-paint "La France aux Français" ("France to the French") on the outer wall of Maison Mumbai and firebomb the covered outdoor eating area. Hassan catches them in the act and scares them off, but his hands get burned. Mallory, deducing who is responsible, dismisses Jean-Pierre and personally scrubs the graffiti off the wall. While she is cleaning, Hassan offers to make her an omelette, which is how Marguerite said Mallory interviews potential chefs. As his hands are bandaged, Hassan instructs Mallory how to make the omelet his way, which uses unusual spices and ingredients. She is so impressed by the result that she invites him to work at Saule Pleureur so he can get a more classical training to supplement his natural ability. Abbu is initially against the move, but ultimately allows Hassan to go.

Marguerite accuses Hassan of using her to help him get his new position, and they compete for Mallory's approval in the kitchen. Hassan outshines Marguerite, and his cooking, which evolves into a unique French-Indian fusion, results in Saule Pleureur receiving a second Michelin star. The award gets him national attention, and he accepts a job at a fancy Parisian molecular cuisine restaurant. While he is gone, Abbu and Mallory begin seeing each other.

In Paris, Hassan's style quickly draws attention, and there is speculation that he may bring his new restaurant a third Michelin star. Over time, however, he becomes increasingly lonely and distracted by thoughts of his family and Marguerite, so one day he returns to St. Antonin. He tells Marguerite he has a business proposition for her and asks her to help him cook a dish he has not made for a long time. They prepare it in the kitchen at Saule Pleureur, and, when the Kadams and some friends arrive for dinner, everyone is surprised to see Hassan. Mallory announces she is giving him control of Saule Pleureur, and he says he is moving back to the village to run the restaurant with Marguerite. Hassan does not answer the call that will reveal whether the restaurant in Paris received a third Michelin star, saying he will earn a third star with his friends and family. The group carries their meal across the road to eat at Maison Mumbai.

Cast
 Helen Mirren as Madame Mallory
 Om Puri as Abbu "Papa" Kadam
 Manish Dayal as Hassan Haji Kadam
 Rohan Chand as Hassan Kadam (7 years old)
 Charlotte Le Bon as Marguerite
 Amit Shah as Mansur Kadam
 Farzana Dua Elahe as Mahira Kadam
 Dillon Mitra as Mukthar Kadam
 Aria Pandya as Aisha Begum Kadam
 Michel Blanc as Mayor
 Clément Sibony as Jean-Pierre
 Vincent Elbaz as Paul, manager of the Parisian molecular cuisine restaurant
 Shuna Lemoine as Mayor's Wife
 Juhi Chawla as Ammi "Mama" Kadam (guest appearance)

Production
Prior to filming, actors Manish Dayal and Charlotte Le Bon spent a considerable amount of time going to restaurants and observing and learning in kitchens. To create the food featured in the film, producer Juliet Blake consulted Indian-born chef Floyd Cardoz, who practiced "fusing together two cultures through cooking."

Principal photography for the film began on September 23, 2013, in Saint-Antonin-Noble-Val, and there was extensive filming at scenic locales in Midi-Pyrénées. Some scenes were shot in the Cité du Cinéma studio complex, located in Saint-Denis, north of Paris. After nine weeks of shooting in France, the production moved to The Netherlands.

To make Indian actress Juhi Chawla, who plays the wife of Om Puri's character at the start of the film, look 15 years older than her actual age, the filmmakers aged her digitally in post-production using techniques such as visual refactoring.

Soundtrack

A.R. Rahman composed the music for the film. Hollywood Records released a soundtrack on August 12, 2014.

Release
The first trailer for the film was released on May 13, 2014. Its New York premiere was held at the Ziegfeld Theatre on August 4, 2014, and it was released in the United States on August 8. Walt Disney Studios Motion Pictures distributed The Hundred-Foot Journey globally through its Touchstone Pictures label, except for territories in Europe, the Middle East, and Africa, where rights were sold by Mister Smith Entertainment to independent distributors. Reliance Entertainment distributed the film in India. In France, the film was released as Les recettes du bonheur (Recipes for Happiness).

Home media
The film was released by Touchstone Home Entertainment on Blu-ray Disc and DVD on December 2, 2014.

Reception

Box office
The Hundred-Foot Journey grossed $10,979,290 in the U.S. its opening weekend, finishing in 4th place at the box office. It went on to earn $54,240,821 in the U.S. and $35,273,632 internationally for a worldwide box office total of $89,514,453.

Critical response
On review aggregator website Rotten Tomatoes, the film has an approval rating of 68% based on reviews from 148 critics, with an average score of 6.2/10; the site's critics consensus reads "Director Lasse Hallström does lovely work and Helen Mirren is always worth watching, but The Hundred-Foot Journey travels predictable ground already covered by countless feel-good dramedies." On Metacritic, the film has a weighted average score of 55 out of 100 based on reviews from 36 critics, indicating "mixed or average reviews". Audiences polled by CinemaScore gave the film an average grade of "A" on an A+ to F scale.

The Wrap's Alonso Duralde called the film "a surprisingly bland slumgullion of food porn and emotional manipulation, filtered through the middlebrow sensibilities of director Lasse Hallström." Variety'''s Justin Chang called it "the most soothing brand of cinematic comfort food." Edwin Arnaudin of the Asheville Citizen-Times'' gave the film a "B-plus".

NPR's film critic Kenneth Turan said the film was entertaining, while criticizing the predictability of the story and "wish[ing] that the film had more of the messy juices of life flowing through its veins".

Accolades
For her performance in the film, Helen Mirren was nominated for a Golden Globe Award in the category Best Actress in a Motion Picture – Comedy or Musical.

Notes

References

External links
 
 
 
 
 

2014 films
2014 comedy-drama films
American comedy-drama films
2010s English-language films
English-language Indian films
Cooking films
Films scored by A. R. Rahman
Films about food and drink
Films based on American novels
Films directed by Lasse Hallström
Films produced by Steven Spielberg
Films set in France
Films set in London
Films set in Mumbai
Films shot in France
Films about Indian Americans
Amblin Entertainment films
Reliance Entertainment films
Participant (company) films
DreamWorks Pictures films
Touchstone Pictures films
Films with screenplays by Steven Knight
Films about chefs
Harpo Productions films
Constantin Film films
American films based on actual events
Films produced by Oprah Winfrey
Entertainment One films
Films shot in India
2010s American films